The May Bumps 2003 were a set of rowing races held at Cambridge University from Wednesday 11 June 2003 to Saturday 14 June 2003. The event was run as a bumps race and was the 112th set of races in the series of May Bumps that have been held annually in mid-June since 1887. In 2003, a total of 169 crews took part (100 men's crews and 69 women's crews), with around 1500 participants in total.

Head of the River crews 
 Caius men rowed-over in 1st position, retaining the headship and holding it for the 5th time since 1998.

 Newnham women bumped Jesus, Caius and Emmanuel to take their first Mays headship since 1976.

Highest 2nd VIIIs 
 The highest men's 2nd VIII at the end of the week was Caius II, who bumped Downing II on the 1st day.

 The highest women's 2nd VIII was Emmanuel II, who bumped Jesus II on the 2nd day.

Links to races in other years

Bumps Charts 
Below are the bumps charts for the men's and women's 1st divisions. The men's bumps charts are on the left, and women's bumps charts on the right. The bumps chart represents the progress of every crew over all four days of the racing. To follow the progress of any particular crew, simply find the crew's name on the left side of the chart and follow the line to the end-of-the-week finishing position on the right of the chart.

May Bumps results
May Bumps
May Bumps
May Bumps